Heterocrossa gonosemana is a species of moth in the family Carposinidae. It is endemic to New Zealand.

Taxonomy 

This species was described by Edward Meyrick in 1882 using material he collected in Dunedin in February. In 1922 Meyrick classified Heterocrossa as a synonym of the genus Carposina. George Hudson discussed and illustrated this species in his 1928 publication The Butterflies and Moths of New Zealand. However John S. Dugdale doubted whether the illustration by Hudson of H. gonosemana was based on a specimen of that species. In 1978 Elwood Zimmerman argued that the genus Heterocrassa  should not be a synonym of Carposina as the genitalia of the species within the genus Heterocrassa are distinctive. In 1988 Dugdale assigned the species back to the genus Heterocrossa. The lectotype specimen is held at the Natural History Museum, London.

Description 
Meyrick described this species as follows:
This species is variable in appearance and tends to be of a darker shade in the more southern parts of New Zealand in comparison to the northern localities.

Distribution 
This species is endemic to New Zealand. This species is found throughout the country and has been collected at Wellington, Nelson, Otira River, Dunedin, Lake Wakatipu, Invercargill, Stewart Island, and Auckland Island.

Biology and behaviour 
This species is on the wing from November until February. It can be found during the day resting on tree trucks where it blends well with lichen patches. The larvae of this species is very active when it is disturbed. This species spends the winter as a pupa. The pupa is 8mm in length and is greenish-white in colour. Its abdominal segments are short while the leg and wing cases are unusually large. The pupa is enclosed in a cocoon that can be found in the soil beneath the larvae host. The cocoon is oval in shape and approximately 12mm in length. The adult moth emerged in December when bred in captivity. The adult moth is attracted to light.

Habitat and host species 

This species prefers forest habitat. The larvae have been recorded feeding on seeds and fruit of Griselinia lucida. It is possible the larvae also feed on the fruit of Griselinia littoralis.

References

External links

Image of lectotype specimen

Carposinidae
Moths of New Zealand
Moths described in 1882
Endemic fauna of New Zealand
Taxa named by Edward Meyrick
Fauna of the Auckland Islands
Endemic moths of New Zealand